The Gallery of Modern Art (GOMA) is an art museum located within the Queensland Cultural Centre in the South Bank precinct of Brisbane, Queensland, Australia. The gallery is part of QAGOMA.

GOMA, which opened on 2 December 2006, is the largest gallery of modern and contemporary art in Australia, and houses Australia's first purpose-built cinematheque. The gallery is situated on Kurilpa Point next to the Queensland Art Gallery (QAG) building and the State Library of Queensland, and faces the Brisbane River and the CBD. The building was designed by Sydney architecture firm Architectus.

Design

In July 2002, Sydney-based company Architectus was commissioned by the Queensland Beattie Government following an Architect Selection Competition, to design the Queensland Art Gallery's second site, the Gallery of Modern Art (GOMA). A main theme of Architectus's design was a pavilion in the landscape, one which assumes its position as both hub and anchor for this important civic precinct. Critical to this is the building's response to the site, its natural topography, existing patterns of urban generation, and the river. Architectus was awarded the 2007 RAIA National Award for Public Architecture for the design of GOMA.

Exhibitions

Past and current exhibitions at GOMA include:
Water (07 December 2019 – 26 April 2020)
I, Object (3 August 2019 - 29 August 2021)
Work, Work, Work (3 August 2019 - 19 July 2020)
Perceptions of Time (25 May 2019 - 28 June 2020)
Geometries (25 May 2019 - 2 February 2020)
Quilty ( 29 June - 13 October 2019)
Margaret Olley: A Generous Life ( 15 June - 13 October 2019)
Patricia Piccinini: Curious Affection (24 March - 5 August 2018)
Yayoi Kusama: Life is the Heart of a Rainbow (4 November 2017 - 11 February 2018)
Gerhard Richter: The Life of Images (14 October 2017 - 4 February 2018)
Marvel: Creating the Cinematic Universe (27 May - 3 September 2017)
Cindy Sherman (28 May - 3 October 2016)
David Lynch: Between Two Worlds (14 March - 8 June 2015)
Future Beauty: 30 Years of Japanese Fashion (1 November 2014 – 15 February 2015)
Cai Guo-Qiang: Falling Back to Earth (23 November 2013 – 11 May 2014)
Matisse: Drawing Life (3 December 2011 – 4 March 2012)
Henri Cartier-Bresson: The Man, The Image & The World (28 August - 27 November 2011)
Surrealism: The Poetry of Dreams (11 June - 2 October 2011) 
21st Century: Art in the First Decade (18 December 2010 – 26 April 2011)
Valentino, Retrospective: Past/Present/Future (7 August – 14 November 2010) 
Ron Mueck (8 May – 1 August 2010)
The China Project (28 March – 28 June 2009)
Picasso & his collection (9 June - 14 September 2008)
Andy Warhol (8 December 2007 – 13 April 2008)

Asia Pacific Triennial of Contemporary Art
The Gallery of Modern Art (GOMA) hosts the Asia-Pacific Triennial of Contemporary Art jointly with the Queensland Art Gallery (QAG), since opening in 2006.
The 10th Asia Pacific Triennial of Contemporary Art (APT10) (4 December 2021 - 25 April 2022)
The 9th Asia Pacific Triennial of Contemporary Art (APT9) (24 November 2018 - 28 April 2019)
The 8th Asia Pacific Triennial of Contemporary Art (APT8) (21 November 2015 - 10 April 2016)
The 7th Asia Pacific Triennial of Contemporary Art (APT7) (8 December 2012 – 14 April 2013)
The 6th Asia Pacific Triennial of Contemporary Art (APT6) (5 December 2009 – 5 April 2010)
The 5th Asia Pacific Triennial of Contemporary Art (APT5) (2 December 2006 – 27 May 2007)
The 4th Asia Pacific Triennial of Contemporary Art (APT4) (12 September 2002 - 27 January 2003)
The 3rd Asia Pacific Triennial of Contemporary Art (APT3) (9 September 1999 - 26 January 2000)
The 2nd Asia Pacific Triennial of Contemporary Art (APT2) (27 September 1996 - 19 January 1997)
The 1st Asia Pacific Triennial of Contemporary Art (APT1) (17 September -5 December 1993)

Notable works

Im Wald (In the Forest), 1990, by Georg Baselitz
A book from the sky, 1987–91, by Xu Bing
The cubic structural evolution project, 2004, by Olafur Eliasson
Best Foot Forward, 2011, by Julia Mage’au Gray
Untitled, 2006–07, by Anish Kapoor
Void (#13), 1991–92, by Anish Kapoor
Two trees on Mary Street ... Amen!, 1975, by Willem de Kooning
Soul under the moon, 2002, by Yayoi Kusama
Infinity nets, 2000, by Yayoi Kusama
The obliteration room, 2002–present, by Yayoi Kusama
Global groove, 1973, by Nam June Paik
TV cello, 2000, by Nam June Paik
Untitled 2007/2008, by Cindy Sherman
Night Life, 2018, by James Turrell
With Winds, 1990, by Lee Ufan
Dropping a Han dynasty urn, 1995, by Ai Weiwei

See also

List of museums in Brisbane
Museum of Contemporary Art, Brisbane, located in South Brisbane from 1987 to 1994

References

External links

 Queensland Art Gallery and Queensland Gallery of Modern Art official website

Contemporary art galleries in Australia
Museums in Brisbane
Modernist architecture in Australia
Buildings and structures completed in 2006
Art museums established in 2006
Art museums and galleries in Queensland
2006 establishments in Australia
South Brisbane, Queensland
Queensland Cultural Centre